Baltimore County Public Schools is the school district in charge of all public schools in Baltimore County, Maryland, United States. It is the 25th largest school system in the US as of 2013. The school system is managed by the Board of Education, headquartered in Towson. The superintendent is Darryl L. Williams, appointed by the School Board on June 11, 2019.

Schools
All areas in Baltimore County are unincorporated; as there are no incorporated cities in Baltimore County, all place names are neighborhoods, and have no legal jurisdiction over their areas.

Elementary schools
There are currently 106 elementary schools:

 Arbutus Elementary School
 Baltimore Highlands Elementary School
 Battle Grove Elementary School
 Bear Creek Elementary School
 Bedford Elementary School
 Berkshire Elementary School
 Carney Elementary School
 Carroll Manor Elementary School
 Catonsville Elementary School
 Cedarmere Elementary School
 Chadwick Elementary School
 Chapel Hill Elementary School
 Charlesmont Elementary School
 Chase Elementary School
 Chatsworth School
 Chesapeake Terrace Elementary School
 Church Lane Elementary Technology
 Colgate Elementary School
 Cromwell Valley Elementary Magnet School
 Deep Creek Elementary School
 
 Dogwood Elementary School
 Dundalk Elementary School
 Edgemere Elementary School
 Edmondson Heights Elementary School
 Elmwood Elementary School
 Essex Elementary School
 Fifth District Elementary School
 Franklin Elementary School
 Fullerton Elementary School
 Glenmar Elementary School
 Glyndon Elementary School
 Grange Elementary School
 Halethorpe Elementary School
 Halstead Academy
 Hampton Elementary School
 Harford Hills Elementary School
 Hawthorne Elementary School
 Hebbville Elementary School
 Hernwood Elementary School
 Hillcrest Elementary School
 Honeygo Elementary School
 Jacksonville Elementary School
 Johnnycake Elementary School
 Joppa View Elementary School
 Kingsville Elementary School
 Lansdowne Elementary School
 Logan Elementary School
 Lutherville Laboratory
 Mars Estates Elementary School
 Martin Boulevard Elementary School
 Mays Chapel Elementary School
 McCormick Elementary School
 Middleborough Elementary School
 Middlesex Elementary School
 Milbrook Elementary School
 New Town Elementary School
 Norwood Elementary School
 Oakleigh Elementary School
 Oliver Beach Elementary School
 Orems Elementary School
 Owings Mills Elementary School
 Padonia International Elementary School
 Perry Hall Elementary School
 Pine Grove Elementary School
 Pinewood Elementary School
 Pleasant Plains Elementary School
 Pot Spring Elementary School
 Powhatan Elementary School
 Prettyboy Elementary School
 Randallstown Elementary School
 Red House Run Elementary School
 Reisterstown Elementary School
 Relay Elementary School
 Riderwood Elementary School
 Riverview Elementary School
 Rodgers Forge Elementary School
 Sandalwood Elementary School
 Sandy Plains Elementary School
 Scotts Branch Elementary School
 Seneca Elementary School
 Seven Oaks Elementary School
 Seventh District Elementary School
 Shady Spring Elementary School
 Sparks Elementary School
 Stoneleigh Elementary School
 Summit Park Elementary School
 Sussex Elementary School
 Timber Grove Elementary School
 Timonium Elementary School
 Victory Villa Elementary School
 Villa Cresta Elementary School
 Vincent Farm Elementary School
 Warren Elementary School
  
 Westchester Elementary School
 Westowne Elementary School
 West Towson Elementary School
 Winand Elementary School
 Winfield Elementary School
 Woodbridge Elementary School
 Woodholme Elementary School
 Woodmoor Elementary School

Middle schools
In the mid-1980s, Baltimore County shifted the grades in the intermediate-level schools. Until this time, the schools were called "junior high schools" and had grades 7–9. The 9th grade was moved into the high school and the 6th grade was moved in from nearby elementary schools, creating the current "middle school" model with grades 6–8. There are currently 30 middle schools:

 Arbutus Middle School
 Bridge Center
 Catonsville Middle School
 Cockeysville Middle School
 Deep Creek Magnet Middle School
 Deer Park Middle Magnet School
 Dumbarton Middle School
 Dundalk Middle School
 General John Stricker Middle School
 
 Franklin Middle School
 Hereford Middle School
 Holabird Middle School
 Lansdowne Middle School
 Loch Raven Technical Academy
 Meadowwood Education Center
 Middle River Middle School
Northwest Academy of Health Sciences 
 Parkville Middle and Center of Technology
 Perry Hall Middle School
 Pikesville Middle School
 Pine Grove Middle School
 Ridgely Middle School
 Rosedale Center Middle School
 Southwest Academy
 Sparrows Point Middle School
 Stemmers Run Middle School
 Sudbrook Magnet Middle School
 
 Woodlawn Middle School

High schools
There are currently 25 high schools:

 George Washington Carver Center for Arts and Technology
 Catonsville High School
 Chesapeake High School
 Dulaney High School
 Dundalk High School
 Eastern Technical High School
 Franklin High School
 Hereford High School
 Kenwood High School
 Lansdowne High School
 Loch Raven High School
 Milford Mill Academy
 New Town High School
 Overlea High School & Academy of Finance
 Owings Mills High School
 Parkville High School and Center for Math, Science, and Computer Science
 Patapsco High School and Center for the Arts
 Perry Hall High School
 Pikesville High School
 Randallstown High School
 Sollers Point Technical High School
 Sparrows Point High School
 Towson High School
 Woodlawn High School
 Western School of Technology and Environmental Science

High School Advanced Placement Scores 2015

Magnet Schools
These schools can be attended by any Baltimore County student through an application process. Students attend these schools as full-time students.
 Chesapeake High
 Chatsworth School
 Church Lane Elementary
 Cromwell Valley Elementary
 Deep Creek Middle
 Deer Park Magnet Middle
 Eastern Technical 
 George Washington Carver Center for Arts and Technology
 Halstead Academy 
 Kenwood High
 Lansdowne High
 Lansdowne Middle
 Loch Raven Academy
 Lutherville Laboratory 
 Milford Mill Academy
 Overlea High
 Parkville High
 Parkville Middle
 Patapsco High
 Randallstown High
 Sollers Point Technical High
 Southwest Academy
 Sparrows Point High 
 Sudbrook Magnet Middle
 Towson High 
 Wellwood International
 Western School of Technology
 Windsor Mill Middle
 Woodlawn High

Charter Schools
 Watershed Public Charter School

Specialty schools
 Battle Monument
 Bridge Center
 Campfield Early Childhood Center
 Catonsville Center for Alternative Studies
 Hannah More School
 Maiden Choice School
 R.I.C.A. Catonsville Education Center
 Ridge Ruxton School
 Rosedale Center 
 White Oak School

Capacity issues
In 1978, due to a dip in enrollment projections the elimination of six elementary schools and the repurposing of two middle schools was proposed by the board and eventually implemented by then superintendent Robert Y. Dubel despite significant public objection .  At the January 11, 1978 board meeting: Dundalk, Gray Manor, Inverness, Lutherville, Parkville, and Towson elementary schools were proposed to be closed; Eastwood and Ruxton elementary schools proposed to be repurposed as special education facilities; and Towsontown Junior to be repurposed as  Central Vocational-Technical Center.

Overcrowding in some elementary schools due to population growth became an issue in 2007, particularly at  four elementary schools in the Towson area — Hampton, Riderwood, Rodgers Forge, and Stoneleigh — which were said to have 451 more children than their 1,665-pupil capacity. In December 2007, a parents' advocacy group, Towson Families United, called for construction of a new elementary school to alleviate overcrowding, with the group threatening a demonstration near the courthouse office of Baltimore County Executive James T. Smith Jr. On May 6, 2008, the School Board announced that a new school would open in 2010 near the existing Ridge Ruxton School on Charles Street.

Overcrowding continues to plague the BCPS school system. In 2018 it is particularly bad in the North East area of the school system. Where there is a deficit of over 1700 seats on the elementary level. Furthermore, Perry Hall Middle school is on track to be the largest school in the county with more than 400 students above maximum capacity.

Students and Teachers Accessing Tomorrow (S.T.A.T.)

To create 21st century learning environments that allow for student-centered learning experiences within the school system's "Framework for Teaching and Learning", Baltimore County Public Schools has established Students and Teachers Accessing Tomorrow (S.T.A.T.). S.T.A.T. is aligned with the school system's "Theory of Action", part of which is to "ensure that every school has an equitable, effective digital learning environment". The work that supports S.T.A.T.'s goals includes the district's conversions of curriculum, instruction, assessment, organizational development, infrastructure, communications, policy, and budget.

Demographics and notable events

BCPS has a $1.76 billion budget as per 2016, with a total enrollment of 111,127 students. The majority of its students are white (42.1%) and a 38.8% black student enrollment. Asians and Latinos are a minority with 6.7% and 7.7% enrollment respectively. In 2014, Sean McComb of Patapsco High School was named National Teacher of the Year. Superintendent S. Dallas Dance was appointed to the President's Advisory Commission on Educational Excellence for African Americans in August 2014. The school system was accepted into the prestigious 32-member League of Innovative Schools in February 2013. BCPS is the only school system in Maryland to be designated as ISO 9001 international certification for management.

On November 24, 2020, the school system's computer network suffered a ransomware attack suspected to be due to Ryuk malware. County school officials characterized it as "a catastrophic attack on our technology system"  and said it could be weeks before recovery is complete.  The school system's director of information technology said, "This is a ransomware attack which encrypts data as it sits and does not access or remove it from our system". Prior to the crippling malware attack, state auditors from the Maryland Office of Legislative Audits performed a periodic audit of the Baltimore County School System's computer network in 2019. They found several vulnerabilities in the system, such as insufficient monitoring of security activities, publicly accessible servers not isolated from the school system's internal network, and a lack of "intrusion detection ... for untrusted traffic". Avi Rubin, Technical Director of the Information Security Institute at Johns Hopkins University, said the auditors' discovery of "computers that were running on the internal network with no intrusion detection capabilities" was of particular concern. Although the final report by the Maryland Office of Legislative Audits was released on November 19, 2020, the auditors initially warned the school system of its findings in October 2019.

Leadership
The school district is led by superintendent Darryl Williams and his respective cabinet, consisting of a chief of staff as well as academic, communications, administrative operations, and human resource officers.

References

External links

 Baltimore County Public Schools

 
School districts in Maryland
Education in Baltimore County, Maryland